Barrat Qisarya was a Palestinian Arab Bedouin encampment in the Haifa Subdistrict. It was depopulated during the 1948 Arab-Israeli War on May 15, 1948. According to Morris in February 1948, the 'Arab al Sufsafi and Saidun Bedouin, who inhabited the dunes between Qisarya and Pardes left the area. Evidence of previous occupation includes pieces of marble, pottery and glass, as well as ruined walls. It was located 32 km southwest of Haifa.

References

Bibliography

External links
Welcome To Barrat Qisarya
Barrat Qisarya,  Zochrot 
Survey of Western Palestine, Map 7:   IAA, Wikimedia commons 

Arab villages depopulated during the 1948 Arab–Israeli War
District of Haifa